The Oldenburg T 2 steam locomotives were German 0-4-0 tank engines built between 1896 and 1913 for the Grand Duchy of Oldenburg State Railways (Großherzoglich Oldenburgische Staatseisenbahnen). They were designed for use on branch lines (Lokal- and Nebenbahnen). A total of 38 units were produced, based on a Prussian T 2 prototype and differing only in the boiler fittings. Unlike their Prussian cousins, they had no steam dome and the regulator was located in the smokebox. Its permitted top speed of 50 km/h was also higher than the Prussian version.

The Deutsche Reichsbahn took over all of them, apart from number 113, designated them as DRG Class 98.1 and allocated them numbers 98 101 to 98 137. Most of the locomotives were retired in 1926 and 1927, however, and only a few were still working up to 1931. Several locomotives continued in service until 1953 as works engines in locomotive repair shops.

See also
Grand Duchy of Oldenburg State Railways
List of Oldenburg locomotives and railbuses
Länderbahnen

Literature 
 
 

0-4-0T locomotives
T 2
Railway locomotives introduced in 1896
Hanomag locomotives
Standard gauge locomotives of Germany
B n2t locomotives